Joseph Carl Hough Jr. is an ordained minister in the United Church of Christ and served as the interim president of Claremont Graduate University in Claremont, California from 2009 to 2010. He is an author, coauthor, and editor of several books.

Hough was the fifteenth president of Union Theological Seminary in the City of New York where he served for 9 years.  He serves as the William E. Dodge Professor of Social Ethics Emeritus.

Hough has also worked with Vanderbilt University and Claremont School of Theology.

Education
Hough completed his undergraduate studies at Wake Forest University and his B.D., M.A., and Ph.D. degrees from Yale University.

Awards
He has been awarded various honour during his career.
Doctor of Divinity from Wake Forest University
Centennial Medal for Distinguished Services from Claremont Graduate University
Joshua Award from the Jewish Federation Council
Alumni Award for Distinction in Theological Education from Yale Divinity School
"Urban Angels" Award from New York Theological Seminary
Distinguished Service Award from the Association of Theological Schools in the United States and Canada

Works

Books

 - approximate date

Articles

References

Year of birth missing (living people)
Living people
Wake Forest University alumni
Yale Divinity School alumni
Vanderbilt University staff
United Church of Christ ministers
Heads of universities and colleges in the United States